Shine Distillery and Grill is a restaurant, bar, and distillery in Portland, Oregon's Boise neighborhood, in the United States.

Description

Shine is a restaurant, bar, and distillery at the corner of Williams and Skidmore in northeast Portland, serving gin, vodka, and whiskey. The two-floor, 250-capacity venue has a family-friendly dining area and an upstairs with a patio for patrons 21 and older. Jonathan Poteet is the owner; Shannon Mosley and Julian Solomon served as master distiller and chef, as of mid 2019.

Shine is the first restaurant, distillery and food service business of its kind in Oregon. The business has also been described as a gay bar and a "queer space" by Portland Monthly and Eater Portland, respectively.

History
The restaurant opened in July 2019. Operations were scheduled to start in December 2018, but were delayed because of the 2018–2019 United States federal government shutdown.

Shine began producing hand sanitizer from alcohol for customers during the COVID-19 pandemic. The business also hosted drive-through performances by drag queens, including Bolivia Charmichaels in 2020. The series returned in 2021.

References

External links

 

2019 establishments in Oregon
American companies established in 2019
Boise, Portland, Oregon
Distilleries in Oregon
Food and drink companies based in Oregon
Food and drink companies established in 2019
LGBT culture in Portland, Oregon
LGBT drinking establishments in Oregon
Microdistilleries
Northeast Portland, Oregon
Restaurants in Portland, Oregon